Mark Barrowcliffe (born 14 July 1964), also known as M.D. Lachlan and Mark Alder, is an English writer. He was born in Coventry and studied at the University of Sussex. After graduating, Barrowcliffe worked as a journalist before penning his first novel, Girlfriend 44. He then made a name for himself writing "lad lit".  He currently lives and writes in Brighton, East Sussex, and South Cambridgeshire.

Barrowcliffe wrote under the pseudonym "M.D. Lachlan" for the Wolfsangel series, which began with Wolfsangel in 2010 and continued to  Lord of Slaughter in 2012. A fourth novel in the series, "Valkyrie's Song", is in progress. He was drawn to fantasy after penning The Elfish Gene.

In 2013, Barrowcliffe began a new series, 'The Banners of Blood', under another pseudonym "Mark Alder", with the first book titled Son of the Morning.

Early life 
Barrowcliffe felt that, as he was growing up, he kept his distance from girls and "cool kids", and he turned his attention to the role-playing game Dungeons & Dragons. His experiences as a child are detailed in his memoir,  The Elfish Gene.

Bibliography

The Wolfsangel series 
Wolfsangel (2010, as M.D. Lachlan)
Fenrir (2011, as M.D. Lachlan)
Lord of Slaughter (2012, as M.D. Lachlan)
Valkyrie's Song (2015, as M.D. Lachlan)
The Night Lies Bleeding (2018, as M.D. Lachlan)

The Banners of Blood series 
Son of the Morning (2014, as Mark Alder)
Son of the Night (2017, as Mark Alder)

Stand-alone works 
Girlfriend 44 (2000)
Infidelity for First-Time Fathers (2002)
Lucky Dog (2004)
The Elfish Gene (2007)
Mr. Wrong (2008)

Adaptations of his works 
Ron Howard has secured the film rights for Barrowcliffe's novel Girlfriend 44, and Infidelity for First-Time Fathers is in development with 2929 Entertainment.

References 

20th-century English novelists
21st-century English novelists
20th-century English male writers
21st-century English male writers
21st-century English memoirists
1964 births
Living people
English male novelists
English male non-fiction writers
Dungeons & Dragons